Seán Evans (born 1948 in Edenderry, County Offaly) is an Irish retired sportsperson.  He played Gaelic football with his local club Ballyfore and was a member of the Offaly senior inter-county team from 1966 until 1975. His son Mark is a present-day star player for Sean's club Ballyfore. He won an All-Ireland Football title in 1971 and 1972. Seán Evans in 2022 was inducted to the Offaly hall of fame.

References

1946 births
Living people
Ballyfore Gaelic footballers
Offaly inter-county Gaelic footballers